Vic-sur-Seille (literally Vic on Seille) is a commune in the Moselle department in Grand Est in north-eastern France.

People
It was the birthplace of Georges de La Tour.

Art museum

The art museum of Vic-sur-Seille, in French , was created in 1996. Its most famous work is Saint John the Baptist in the desert, by Georges de La Tour. Its collections include 17th century paintings by Jacques de Létin, Jacques Blanchard, Cesare Dandini, Domenichino, Meiffren Conte, Charles Le Brun, Matthieu Le Nain, Madeleine Boullogne, Jacques Stella, 18th century landscapes and paintings by Sebastiano Ricci, Pierre-Henri de Valenciennes, Jan Frans van Bloemen, Jean-Bernard Restout, Joseph-Marie Vien, and 19th century and beginning of the 20th century paintings by Camille Corot, Paul Baudry, Eugène Isabey, Paul Delaroche, Léon Bonnat.

See also
Communes of the Moselle department
Parc naturel régional de Lorraine

References

External links

Art museum of Vic-sur-Seille

Vicsurseille
Three Bishoprics